is a retired Japanese male volleyball player. He was part of the Japan men's national volleyball team at the 2010 FIVB Volleyball Men's World Championship in Italy. He played for only Suntory Sunbirds in the club level.

Clubs
  Suntory Sunbirds (2005–2020)

References

1983 births
Living people
Japanese men's volleyball players
Place of birth missing (living people)
Asian Games medalists in volleyball
Volleyball players at the 2010 Asian Games
Medalists at the 2010 Asian Games
Asian Games gold medalists for Japan